Celebrity Island with Bear Grylls is a spin-off series of The Island with Bear Grylls. It was first broadcast on Channel 4 as part of a charity campaign for Stand Up to Cancer UK in September 2016. The show has the same format as The Island with Bear Grylls, in which the participants are left on a remote uninhabited Pacific island with only limited water, some basic tools and training and are expected to find their own food, water and shelter. The celebrities however stayed on the island for a shorter period of two weeks. A second series began airing on 29 August 2017. The second series saw the celebrities stay on the island for a longer amount of time, four weeks.

It was announced in July 2018 that a third and final series would be produced, and it aired starting on 9 September 2018.

The celebrity version of the reality show ceased operations for good on 7 October 2018.

Series overview

Series 1 (2016)
At the end of the third series, a celebrity series was confirmed, and was broadcast in September and October 2016 in aid of Cancer Research UK's Stand Up to Cancer campaign. The first series consisted of four 60 minutes episodes. The series saw 10 celebrities live on the island for two weeks.  Aston Merrygold could not cope with living on the island and left in the first episode, while Thom Evans left the following after finding the lack of food difficult.

Celebrities
The ten celebrities participating on the series were:

Series 2 (2017)
It was confirmed on This Morning on ITV that a second series of Celebrity Island with Bear Grylls would be produced. The second series started airing on 29 August 2017 on Channel 4. The second series is longer with the celebrities staying on the island for 4 weeks, 2 weeks more than series one.

In the second episode, RJ Mitte decided to quit after the safety team arrived to help the group cope with torrential rain. Mitte was unhappy with the disorganisation of the group, suggesting that the other participants would be "eaten" within days had the survival situation been "real". Both Sharron Davies and Jordan Stephens left in the following episode unable to cope with the conditions on the island. Mark Watson left after suffering from severe chest pains and insomnia in the final episode, and claimed after the show that he almost died and that his stay on the island had left him in a poor state.

Celebrities

Series 3 (2018)
It was confirmed on This Morning on ITV that a third series of Celebrity Island with Bear Grylls would be produced. The series was also now not part of Stand Up to Cancer, but a standalone series.  Roxanne Pallett left in the first episode (day 5) after a panic attack due to smoke from the camp fire that reminded her of a childhood house fire. Next to leave was Paris Lees after she was criticised for her effort on the island as well as conflict with Eric Roberts.  Montana Brown then left not being able to cope, criticising Bear Grylls and other participants. The rest stayed until the end, although Pete Wicks refused to allow his fellow participants eat a pig, and he was bitten on his finger by a nurse shark he had caught in his net.

It was the final celebrity series before ceasing operations for good.

Celebrities

Episodes
All figures are the total including +1.

Series 1 (2016)

Series 2 (2017)

Series 3 (2018)

References

2016 British television series debuts
2010s British reality television series
British television spin-offs
Channel 4 reality television shows
English-language television shows
Reality television spin-offs